Hiawassee is the central most and smallest township of Clay County, North Carolina, United States. It is situated between Hayesville Township to the west, Shooting Creek Township to the east and Tusquittee Township to the north.  The other two are Brasstown and Sweetwater.

Cities and Towns 
Hiawassee is home to one unincorporated community called Elf, North Carolina, that lies on the east side of Lake Chatuge.

References

Populated places in Clay County, North Carolina
Townships in North Carolina